David S. "Andy" Gronik is an American entrepreneur and business executive from the State of Wisconsin.

Biography 
David S. "Andy" Gronik is an American entrepreneur and business executive from the State of Wisconsin who, between 1980 and 2013, built a number of successful global appraisal, consulting, and asset management businesses that helped struggling corporations find capital and improve their operating performance.

Gronik helped develop the collateral evaluation standards that became part of the foundation of today’s multi-trillion dollar leveraged finance industry. Appraisals conducted by Gronik’s firm, AccuVal, ultimately helped to support billions of dollars in borrowing annually.

Gronik built proprietary applications that revolutionized the way global market data is used to make fully informed business decisions. He has been a keynote speaker on market conditions and trends and was invited to be a member of an EFLA (formerly ELA) delegation on a trade mission to China. Gronik was invited by the World Bank to teach collateral lending workshops to international lenders in China.

After selling AccuVal in 2013, Gronik founded GroBiz LLC, a consulting firm that “helps business GroBigger and GroBetter.” Gronik also founded StageW.org, a nonprofit 501(c)(4) to “bridge the political divide” and find the best solutions to complex issues dividing Wisconsin. As part of StageW’s work, Gronik also started KitchenTable Conversations to bring together people with very different backgrounds and political affiliations in order to find workable plans to address the most divisive issues affecting the quality of life in Wisconsin. 

While volunteering as a high school football coach, Gronik drew on his own high school academic and athletic experience to develop and piloted ScoreAs.org, a mentorship platform for high school athletes to lift each other to academic success.

Gronik has been featured in Who's Who In Leading American Executives and nominated Entrepreneur of the Year. Gronik was the first candidate to seek the Democratic nomination to oppose Scott Walker in the 2018 Wisconsin gubernatorial election in a field a of challengers that would ultimately grow to eighteen. Gronik was an athlete through high school and college and a volunteer football coach and mentor. He has been married for more than three decades and is the father of two children. He is an outdoor enthusiast, an avid cyclist, downhill skier and hiker, has competed in many sprint triathlons, and completed two half Ironman triathlons.

Early life and education 
Gronik was born in 1957 in Milwaukee, Wisconsin and was raised in Glendale, Wisconsin. The son of Anne and David Gronik, David Jr. was called “Andy” from birth. Gronik graduated from Nicolet High School in 1975 where he played football, wrestled, threw the discus and was named “Jewish Teen Athlete of 1974-75.” Gronik attended the University of Wisconsin-Milwaukee for one year before transferring to the University of Georgia (UGA), where he was also a student athlete and broke UGA’s school record in the discus throw. Gronik earned a Bachelor's degree in business administration from the Terry School of Business in 1979. Gronik went on to earn a variety of professional designations including Member Appraisal Institute (MAI), Member American Society of Appraisers, and Member Royal Institute of Chartered Surveyors. Gronik was also licensed as a certified general appraiser in all 50 states.

Business experience 
Quaker Oats Company - After graduating from UGA, Gronik accepted a position with the Quaker Oats Company where he was responsible for selling Quaker retail grocery products throughout northeast Georgia. After seven months, Gronik was offered a promotion to Chattanooga, TN, at which time he tendered his resignation to join David S. Gronik & Co., Inc. (DSGCo), in Milwaukee, Wisconsin. Founded by his father, David S Gronik Sr., in the 1950s, DSGCo was a small auction firm operating primarily in southeastern Wisconsin. As a young man, Gronik Jr. had worked part time for his father cleaning factories and preparing machinery for sale at auction. He conducted his first auction at age fifteen and later became a licensed auctioneer.

The Gronik Company Incorporated – Immediately upon joining DSGCo, Gronik fundamentally shifted the focus of his father’s business from liquidating corporate assets to helping corporations solve problems and grow. He went on to found The Gronik Company Incorporated and served as president & CEO, focusing on appraisal and consulting services and expanding the firm’s focus to serving manufacturing companies in 100+ industries nationwide. With the knowledge gained from selling machinery as a young man, Gronik recognized it was possible to accurately estimate the value of these assets so it could be used as additional collateral for companies unable to borrow money on the strength of their operating performance.

Gronik took this concept to leading lending institutions like Citicorp Industrial Credit (now Citibank), Bankers Trust, Bank of America, and Congress Financial Corporation (now part of Wells Fargo Bank), suggesting ways these institutions could expand upon factoring accounts receivables to include lending on the value of a company’s machinery and equipment. Gronik played an integral role in developing the collateral evaluation standards that make this type of lending safer which, in turn, made it easier for companies that couldn’t borrow money on the strength of their operating performance to gain access to the money needed to operate their businesses. Later, Gronik suggested additional standards to help banks lend money to companies using their inventory as collateral. These building blocks created the foundation for today’s multi-trillion dollar leveraged finance industry and in the 1980s allowed Gronik to help companies like Harley-Davidson obtain the financing needed to restructure their operations and avoid bankruptcy.

By 1988, Gronik had established The Gronik Company Incorporated as one of the premier firms serving asset-based lenders nationwide. In June of 1988, following Gronik’s attempt to purchase the business, he was terminated by his father. Gronik went on to co-found AccuVal Associates Incorporated and LiquiTec Industries Incorporated in June of 1988, firms he would then grow to international prominence. 

AccuVal Associates Incorporated, LiquiTec Industries Incorporated and BrainStorm Marketing Inc. - In June 1988, Gronik co-founded AccuVal Associates, Incorporated and LiquiTec Industries Incorporated, serving as president and CEO of both firms. Gronik grew the companies into global appraisal, consulting, and asset management firms serving clients throughout the United States, Canada, Mexico, South America and Europe. In May of 1991, AccuVal was named one of “Milwaukee’s Future 50 Rising Businesses.” During this time, Gronik also founded BrainStorm Marketing Inc. where he served as president and creative director, helping develop and execute fully integrated marketing strategies and companies like Elefanten Shoes launch their children’s shoes brand in the United States. 

DoveBid Valuation Services - In 2000, in the midst of the dot.com bubble, DoveBid Inc. (DoveBid) purchased AccuVal and LiquiTec and named Gronik the global president and COO of DoveBid Valuation Services (DVS), a wholly owned subsidiary of DoveBid. Between 2000-2003, Gronik grew DVS into the largest appraisal and consulting firm of its type in the world, placing DVS among the most profitable businesses under the DoveBid umbrella of companies. Despite three attempts, DoveBid was unsuccessful in its bid to become publicly traded. This led to restructuring in March 2003, and Gronik being offered the opportunity to repurchase his AccuVal and LiquiTec, an opportunity he immediately accepted. 

AccuVal Associates Incorporated and LiquiTec Industries Incorporated - In April 2003, Gronik relaunched AccuVal and LiquiTec, once again serving as President and CEO of both firms. During the next nine months of operation, Gronik opened eight offices in the United States, an office in Canada, and one in Singapore. AccuVal immediately regained its global prominence, providing appraisal services supporting billions of dollars of asset-backed loans annually and helping manufacturing companies worldwide solve a variety of complex problems integral to their survival and success. 

GroBiz LLC – In 2014, Gronik founded GroBiz LLC (GroBiz) to help corporations “GroBigger and GroBetter™.” Since that time, Gronik has provided mostly pro bono services to friends seeking to start new business, grow their existing businesses and/or solve a variety of operational challenges. Gronik also mentors young entrepreneurs with startups. 

ScoreA’s.org - In 2015, Gronik returned to his alma mater Nicolet High School (NHS) as a volunteer football coach. While coaching he was reminded of his own academic challenges in high school. This prompted him to found ScoreAs.org, an athlete-to-athlete tutoring philosophy that helps teammates lift each other to academic success. NHS piloted the program under Gronik’s supervision. 

StageW.org and KitchenTable Conversations - Late in 2015, Gronik turned his focus to developing possible solutions to the most difficult and divisive problems affecting people’s quality of life throughout Wisconsin. In 2016, Gronik founded StageW.org to take an unbiased look at these complex issues through the eyes of the people most impacted by them. Gronik started “KitchenTable Conversations,” inviting people from all backgrounds and political affiliations to come together, consider each other’s perspectives and life experiences, and find workable solutions. Ultimately, hundreds of people attended KitchenTable Conversations throughout the state and thousands participated virtually.

Home Contamination 
In October 2009, Gronik purchased a home in Fox Point, Wisconsin, that was later determined to be contaminated by toxigenic mold and pathogenic bacteria. Upon discovery of the mold in May 2010, the Gronik family immediately moved out, never to return. During the seven months in residency, Gronik, his wife Mary, their five-year-old son and two-year-old daughter all became very ill. Gronik experienced the aggressive return of his Crohn’s disease which had been in remission for decades, as well as a variety of serious side effects from medications prescribed to treat the condition. Humira (adalimumab) put Gronik’s Crohn’s disease back into remission. These events triggered a series of lawsuits between Gronik and sellers Norman and Susan Balthasar, their real estate broker Shorewest Realty, and their insurance company Chubb, which spanned approximately five years. Each of the defendants agreed to settlements paid to the Groniks, the terms of which were never disclosed. Gronik sold the property in 2015 without warranty, and the purchaser razed the house.

Gronik took leave from AccuVal and LiquiTec in 2010 to seek medical treatment for his family and himself and to address the lawsuits connected to his home. During this period Gronik’s business partner Richard Schmitt sought control of the companies and filed suit making claims that were never substantiated. In 2013, still engaged in lawsuits involving his home and seeking medical treatment for Crohn’s disease, Gronik sold the businesses to Mr. Schmitt who, in turn, resold the businesses to Gordon Brothers, a direct competitor.

In September 2017, the Milwaukee Journal Sentinel and Associated Press reported that court records were revealed to show that Gronik was fired by his father (after Mr. Gronik offered to purchase the company he had established and served as CEO) and sued by his former business partner for allegedly fraudulent business practices, claims for which Mr. Schmitt never offered evidence in court and ultimately dropped. In the same month, it was reported that Gronik was paid at least $6.1 million to settle court cases in which he claimed his move into a mold-infested house negatively impacted his personal health and his family's health. Gronik said toxigenic mold and pathogenic bacteria in the house shocked his Crohn's disease out of remission. It was later reported that Gronik's lawyer falsely claimed that he was terminally ill, a claim made without Mr. Gronik's knowledge or consent and at a court proceeding in which Mr. Gronik was not present.

2018 gubernatorial campaign 

In July 2017, Gronik announced his candidacy for the Democratic nomination to oppose Scott Walker in the 2018 Wisconsin gubernatorial election. Gronik was moved to run for office after the enthusiastic response to StageW. Gronik’s candidacy garnered statewide support in a democratic primary field that grew to 18 candidates.

Gronik launched his campaign with a 6:40 minute video titled “Their Stories,” featuring four Wisconsinites whose lives were directly impacted by Scott Walker’s policies along with Gronik’s own story as a businessman and father who, along with his wife Mary, overcame fertility challenges. WISN TV Up Front with Mike Gousha interviewed Gronik on July 15, 2017 and The Wisconsin Eye interviewed Gronik on July 17, 2017 shortly after he declared his candidacy. Gronik quickly demonstrated a penchant for straight talk on divisive issues.

On April 19, the Wisconsin Gazette, a statewide LGBT and progressive newspaper, released their endorsement of Andy Gronik stating, "We must ensure the candidate is the one who stands the best chance to win - That candidate is Andy Gronik." In doing so, the Wisconsin Gazette became the first newspaper to formally endorse a candidate in the Democratic Primary of the 2018 Wisconsin gubernatorial election.

On May 12, during the Wisconsin Republican Convention, Gronik set up outside the convention hall interviewing Wisconsinites about their experiences with Scott Walker and sponsored a mobile billboard to circle the convention center a mobile billboard to circle the convention center, highlighting Walker's connections to special interest money.

Gronik submitted 3,602 signatures to the Wisconsin Election Commission, well over enough for him to be included on the ballot. The Republican Party submitted a complaint alleging that thousands of these signatures had been collected by felons and were thus ineligible. Gronik responded, stating that while these collectors had committed felonies in the past, they had served their time and were eligible to collect signatures. Further, he stated that in articulating these complaints, the Republican Party was being "offensively racist" by assuming that, because the majority of his signatures were from the urban Milwaukee area, that they were felons. The Wisconsin Election Commission reviewed Gronik's signatures, deemed them valid and struck down the Republican Party's challenge by voting unanimously to place Gronik on the ballot.

On June 21, 2018, Gronik announced his decision to withdraw from the race following a Marquette University Law School poll that found he was supported by four percent of Democrats who planned to vote in the Aug. 14 primary election. The overriding issue was the high cost to build name recognition in the very crowded field.

References

External Links 
https://www.grobiz.com/

https://www.scoreas.org/

https://stagew.org/

https://www.youtube.com/watch?v=Es4Tz4nMN6Y

https://www.youtube.com/watch?v=BMKCkPwOfqA

https://www.youtube.com/watch?v=se3CYe7EN7Y

Living people
Year of birth missing (living people)
Businesspeople from Wisconsin
Politicians from Milwaukee
American investors
University of Georgia alumni
University of Wisconsin–Milwaukee alumni
People from Glendale, Wisconsin
People from Fox Point, Wisconsin